Olexiy Mykolayovych Popov (born 6 April 1980 in Zaporizhzhia, USSR) is a Ukrainian professional futsal coach and former player. He was a member of the Ukrainian national futsal team.

Career 
Popov was a football player in his youth. Popov attended the Metalurh Zaporizhzhia Youth school system. He began his professional career in 1997 for FC Metalurh Zaporizhzhia, but then turned to futsal. Popov played for the Winner Ford-Universytet Zaporizhia. In 1999 – 2001 he was part of futsal club Zaporizhkoks. In 2001, he moved to the Shakhtar Donetsk. In 2005 Popov went to Russia, where he later played for the Dinamo Moskva, Dina Moscow, and Norilsk Nickel. In April 2008, Dinamo Moskva participated in the final games of the UEFA Futsal Cup. Olexiy helped the team to win the tournament and to get the title of the strongest team of Europe.

In the Ukrainian national futsal team Olexiy Popov was twice a silver medalist of UEFA Futsal Championship, in 2001 and 2003. 

In August 2002, Olexiy became a member of a student team at the Student World Cup.

In the end of 2004, Popov as a part of the national team took part in the World Cup of his career. 

On 25 May 2018, Popov announced his retirement at the age of 38.

After the end of his playing career, he was appointed assistant coach to Evgenii Kuksevich at Norilsk Nickel.

On 26 October 2020, he received the UEFA Futsal B Diploma.

Honours

Player
Winner Ford-Universytet 
 Ukrainian Men's Futsal Cup: 1998/99

Shakhtar
 Ukrainian Men's Futsal Championship: 2001–02, 2003–04, 2004–05
 Ukrainian Men's Futsal Cup: 2002–03, 2003–04

Dinamo
 Russian Futsal Super League (6): 2005–06, 2006–07, 2007–08, 2010–11, 2011–12, 2012–13
 Russian Futsal Cup: 2007–08, 2008–09, 2009–10, 2010–11, 2012–13
 UEFA Futsal Cup: 2006–07

Araz
 Azerbaijan Futsal Premier League: 2013–14

Ukraine
 UEFA Futsal Championship runner-up: 2001, 2003

Individual
 Best goalkeeper of Ukrainian League: 2001–02

Assistant
Norilsk Nickel
 Russian Futsal Cup: 2019–20

References

External links 
 
 UEFA profile
 Profile at Russian Futsal Association 
 MFK Dinamo squad 
 MFK Norilsk Nickel squad 

1980 births
Living people
Footballers from Zaporizhzhia
Futsal goalkeepers
Ukrainian footballers
Ukrainian emigrants to Russia
FC Metalurh Zaporizhzhia players
MFC Shakhtar Donetsk players
MFK Dinamo Moskva players
MFK Dina Moskva players
Ukrainian men's futsal players
Ukrainian expatriate futsal players
Sportspeople from Zaporizhzhia
Association footballers not categorized by position
Ukrainian expatriate sportspeople in Russia